Anthony Roncaglia (born 30 August 2000) is a French professional footballer who plays as centre-back for Ligue 2 club Bastia.

Honours 
Bastia
 Championnat National 3: 2018–19
 Championnat National: 2020–21

References

External links 
 SC Bastia profile
 

2000 births
Living people
Footballers from Corsica
French footballers
Association football central defenders
SC Bastia players
AC Ajaccio players
Championnat National 3 players
Championnat National players
Ligue 2 players